Bruno Gamberini (July 16, 1950 – August 28, 2011) was the Roman Catholic archbishop of the Roman Catholic Archdiocese of Campinas, Brazil.

Born in Matão, São Paulo, and ordained to the priesthood in 1974, Gamberini became a bishop in 1995 and in 2004 was appointed archbishop of the Campinas Archdiocese.

Notes

1950 births
2011 deaths
People from Matão
21st-century Roman Catholic archbishops in Brazil
Roman Catholic archbishops of Campinas
Roman Catholic bishops of Bragança Paulista